Robert Stevenson may refer to:
 Robert J. Stevenson (1915–1975), American actor, politician, and husband of Peggy Stevenson (1924–2014)
 Robert Stevenson (civil engineer) (1772–1850), Scottish lighthouse engineer
 Robert Stevenson (filmmaker) (1905–1986), English film writer and director
 Robert Stevenson (musicologist) (1916–2012), American musicologist
 Robert Alan Mowbray Stevenson (1847–1900), Scottish art critic
 Robert Louis Stevenson (1850–1894), Scottish writer and grandson of the lighthouse engineer Robert Stevenson
 Robert Macaulay Stevenson (1854–1952), Scottish painter
 Bob Stevenson (trade unionist) (1926–2003), Scottish trade union leader
 Rob Stevenson, music executive
 Robert Lindsay (actor) (Robert Stevenson, born 1949), English actor
 Robert Horne Stevenson (1812–1886), Scottish minister
 Robert A. Stevenson (1918–2000), American ambassador to Malawi

Sportspeople
 R. C. Stevenson (Robert C. Stevenson, 1886–c. 1973), Scottish international rugby union player
 Robert Stevenson (Australian footballer) (born 1976), former Australian rules footballer
 Robert Stevenson (basketball), first head men's basketball coach at DePaul University
 Robert Stevenson (equestrian) (born 1968), Canadian Olympic equestrian
 Robert Stevenson (footballer, born 1869) (1869–?), Scottish footballer (Thames Ironworks)
 Robert Stevenson (footballer, born 1898) (1898–?), Scottish footballer (Grimsby Town)
 Robert Stevenson (Scottish footballer) ( 1910s), Scottish footballer (Morton, St Mirren)
 Robert G. Stevenson (1877–1949), American football coach

See also
 Robert Stephenson (disambiguation)